Madonna del Popolo is a Roman Catholic church located facing the town square of Montecchio, in the province of Terni, region of Umbria, Italy.

History
The present church was erected by the Confraternity del Suffragio, and is documented since 1618, and notes indicated consecration by 1634. In the past, the façade  was painted with the coat of arms of Alfonso I d'Este. The interior has a single nave with a pitched roof. The lateral chapels include works by Giuseppe Boni and a 17th-century canvas depicting the veneration of the Virgin and surrounding saints.  

In the past, the confraternity held the titles of delle Anime Purganti (of the Souls of Purgatory); del Santissimo Sangue (of the Holiest Blood); and della Buona Morte (of the Good Death). In 1798 the confraternity was suppressed, and the property expropriated. The church passed on to other ecclesiastical groups.

References

Churches in the province of Terni
17th-century Roman Catholic church buildings in Italy
Roman Catholic churches completed in 1600